The city of Liverpool has a greater number of public sculptures than any other location in the United Kingdom aside from Westminster. Early examples include works by George Frampton, Goscombe John, Thomas Thornycroft, Charles Bell Birch, Richard Westmacott, Francis Chantrey, John Gibson, Thomas Brock and F.W. Pomeroy, while Barbara Hepworth, Jacob Epstein, Mitzi Cunliffe and Elisabeth Frink provide some of the modern offerings. More recently, local artist Tom Murphy has created a dozen sculptures in Liverpool.

While statues and sculpture are dotted throughout the inner city, there are four primary groupings: inside and around St George's Hall; in St John's Gardens; around the Pier Head; and around the Palm House at Sefton Park. Smaller groups are found in Old Hall Street/Exchange Flags and in and around The Oratory.

The Queen Victoria Monument at Derby Square, an ensemble of 26 bronze figures by C. J. Allen, is described in the Liverpool Pevsner Architectural Guide as one of the most ambitious British monuments to the Queen.

NB: the following list does not include the comprehensive collections held by National Museums Liverpool, or the countless ornate features of many Liverpool buildings.

Royalty

Statesmen and politicians

Military and war memorials

Business and inventors

Sports

Artists and entertainers

Religious figures

Explorers and geographers

Educationists, scientists and philosophers

Philanthropists and clergy

Fictional, poetical and allegorical characters

Animals

Abstract sculpture

See also
Architecture of Liverpool

References

Bibliography

External links
Liverpool Monuments website of Friends of Liverpool Monuments Civic Society
Victorian City Centre: Liverpool Public Art Research Archive, Sheffield Hallam University
Liverpool Architecture and Cityscapes The Victorian Web
Art in Liverpool website of Bob Speel
Pure sensory overload in Liverpool Modern Masters, BBC

Liverpool
Liverpool-related lists
Monuments and memorials in Merseyside
Lists of buildings and structures in Merseyside
Culture in Liverpool